Bray Pit is a nature reserve on the edge of the village of Holyport in Berkshire, England. The nature reserve was under the management of the Berkshire, Buckinghamshire and Oxfordshire Wildlife Trust, but as of December 2019 is no longer listed on the Trust web site.

Geography and site
Bray Pit consists of a small flooded gravel pit surrounded by a strip of woodland, a mature hedge and a wide grassy bank.

Fauna
The site has the following fauna:

Invertebrates
Anthocharis cardamines
Bombus pascuorum
Megachile centuncularis
Osmia rufa
Bombus lapidarius
Bombus lucorum

Birds
Sterna hirundo
Fulica atra
Podiceps cristatus
Dendrocopus major
Ardea cinerea
Delichon urbica
Alcedo atthis
Gallinula chloropus
Hirundo rustica
Apus apus

Flora

The site has the following flora:

Centaurea nigra
Leucanthemum vulgare
Daucus carota
Rhinanthus minor

References

Parks and open spaces in Berkshire
Nature reserves in Berkshire